Ricardo Vela is an American musician and songwriter who was the keyboardist for the band Selena y Los Dinos from 1984 to 1995.

Works
Vela has either written or co-written the following songs that topped on Billboard 200, Billboard Latin Songs, and Mexican Regional Songs charts.

Awards and nominations
Ricky Vela has been nominated for seven awards and won two awards.

Portrayals in media 
Vela appears as himself in the 1997 film Selena. He is portrayed in the 2020 Netflix television show Selena: The Series by Hunter Reese Peña.

References

External links

Year of birth missing (living people)
American people of Mexican descent
Songwriters from Texas
Selena y Los Dinos members
Living people
Latin music songwriters
21st-century American keyboardists